Huan Fan (died 9 February 249), courtesy name Yuanze, was an official and military general of the state of Cao Wei during the Three Kingdoms period of China.

Life
Huan Fan was from Pei State, which is around present-day Suixi County, Anhui. He started his career in the late Eastern Han dynasty as a minor official in the office of the Imperial Chancellor, the position held by Cao Cao, the warlord who controlled the central government and the figurehead Emperor Xian at the time. Sometime in early 220, he was promoted to Left Supervisor of the Feathered Forest section of the imperial guards. Later that year, Cao Cao's son Cao Pi usurped the throne from Emperor Xian and established the Cao Wei state with himself as the new emperor. Cao Pi put Huan Fan, Wang Xiang and Liu Shao in charge of writing the Huang Lan.

During the reign of the second Wei emperor Cao Rui ( 226–239), Huan Fan served as a Master of Writing and Commandant of the Central Army. Later, he was promoted to East General of the Household and General Who Attacks Barbarians, granted imperial authority, and put in charge of overseeing military affairs in Qing and Xu provinces. During his tenure, Huan Fan got into a housing dispute with Zheng Qi, the Inspector of Xu Province. He attempted to abuse his powers by executing Zheng Qi, but the latter reported him to the imperial court first, resulting in Huan Fan being dismissed from office. However, Huan Fan was soon recalled to serve in the Wei government, first as the Inspector of Yan Province and later as the Governor of Ji Province. When he saw that Lü Zhao had reached a higher position than him even though he started serving in the Cao Wei state later than him, he became unhappy and claimed to be ill and stayed at home.

During the Zhengshi era (240–249) in the reign of the third Wei emperor Cao Fang, Huan Fan was appointed as the Minister of Finance. He gained a reputation for being an honest and thrifty official, and was even referred to as "a bag of wisdom". Cao Shuang, the general serving as a regent for the emperor Cao Fang, treated Huan Fan cordially and respectfully, but was not close to him. During his regency, Cao Shuang and his brothers often went out on excursions because they believed that no one posed a threat to them. Huan Fan tried to advise them to be more mindful but they ignored him.

In early 249, Cao Shuang and his brothers followed the emperor Cao Fang out of the imperial capital Luoyang to visit the Gaoping Tombs. During their absence, Cao Shuang's co-regent, Sima Yi, used the opportunity to stage a coup d'état against Cao Shuang in Luoyang. He ordered all the gates of Luoyang to be shut and then issued an order to Huan Fan in Empress Dowager Guo's name, ordering him to take command of the troops under Cao Xi, Cao Shuang's brother. Just as Huan Fan was about to follow the order, his son urged him to side with Cao Shuang instead since Cao Shuang had a political advantage over Sima Yi because the emperor Cao Fang was with him. Huan Fan agreed and headed to Gaoping Tombs, against the advice of his subordinates. He managed to leave Luoyang through the Changping Gate because Si Fan, the officer guarding the gate, used to serve under him and trusted him when he said he had authorisation to leave.

After meeting Cao Shuang and his brothers at Gaoping Tombs, Huan Fan urged them to bring Cao Fang to Xuchang, issue an imperial edict in the emperor's name and denounce Sima Yi as a traitor and call all military forces in the Cao Wei state to attack Sima Yi. He also reassured the Cao brothers that they would not run out of food supplies because he, as the Minister of Finance, had full control over the distribution of food supplies. However, Cao Shuang and his brothers eventually decided to surrender to Sima Yi after Sima Yi promised them that they and their families would not be harmed if they handed over power to him. When Huan Fan heard about it, he cried, "How could a hero like Cao Zidan have pigs and dogs like you as his sons? How could he have not foreseen that one day his family will be doomed because of you!" After returning to Luoyang, Huan Fan was arrested along with Cao Shuang and his brothers, charged with treason, and executed along with the rest of their families.

See also
 Lists of people of the Three Kingdoms

Notes

References

 Chen, Shou (3rd century). Records of the Three Kingdoms (Sanguozhi).
 Pei, Songzhi (5th century). Annotations to Records of the Three Kingdoms (Sanguozhi zhu).

Year of birth unknown
249 deaths
Cao Wei politicians
Cao Wei generals
Politicians from Huaibei
Executed Cao Wei people
People executed by Cao Wei
3rd-century executions
Executed people from Anhui
Generals from Anhui